News24 Nepal is the premium news channel of Nepal owned by Nepal Broadcasting Channel Pvt.Ltd (NBC). News24 broadcasts 24 hrs. per day.

Current Programmes
Hatkadi ( हतकडि )
Sidha Kura Janatasanga (सिधा कुरा जनतासँग)
Call 24
Chha Prasna
Power News
Jaya Swavimaan
Issue of the Day
Hatkadi
 *ETalk

References

Television channels and stations established in 2010
Television channels in Nepal
Television news in Nepal
2010 establishments in Nepal